Circus Ramudu is a 1980 Indian Telugu-language action drama film, produced by Kovai Chezhiyan and directed by Dasari Narayana Rao. It stars N. T. Rama Rao and Jaya Prada, with music composed by K. V. Mahadevan.

Plot
Zamindar Koteswara Rao (Tyagaraju) belongs to the royal family, the happiness arises in their palace when his wife Janaki Devi (Savitri) becomes pregnant after a long time. Learning it, Zamindar's brother-in-law Bhaskar Rao (Rao Gopal Rao), a vicious person becomes jittery and arranges his men to slaughter the newborn child. To the fortune, the child is protected by a circus owner Chalapati Rao (Allu Ramalingaiah) and rears him. In the nick of time, Janaki Devi delivers the second child. Years rolled by, and the younger one Raja (N. T. Rama Rao) a good-hearted person exploited by Bhaskar Rao and submerged in all sorts of vices. Bhaskar Rao also plans to perform his daughter Jaya's (Jaya Prada) marriage with Raja to catch hold of the proprietary. Advocate Yugandhar (Prabhakar Reddy), the personal solicitor to Zamindar always suspects Bhaskar Rao and keeps an eye on him. Once Raja in a drunken state makes an accident in which a person dies, moving forward, he too hits and collapses when a woman, Ankamma (Sujatha) saves him, after recovery, he realizes that the person who died is Ankamma's father. Here he burns out of contrition and accepts his sin before Ankamma when she forgives him. There, he starts loving her which Zamindar opposes, so, he marries Ankamma in the temple. Bhaskar Rao becomes aware of it and makes an accident with Raja, by which he loses his memory. Parallelly, Bhaskar Rao misleads Zamindar by spreading the bereavement of Raja which Zamindar could not tolerate, and dies. After that, Bhaskar Rao hides Raja in a secret place claiming that he has been sent to a foreign for treatment. On the other side, Anakamma becomes pregnant, gives birth to a baby, and reaches the palace when Bhaskar Rao necks her out. Yugandhar spots all these atrocities, fortuitously, he encounters the elder one Ramu (again N. T. Rama Rao) and reveals the entire story. Now Ramu decides to teach a lesson to Bhaskar Rao he enters the palace as Raja, but Jaya recognizes him when Ramu divulges the truth, so, she too joins him and they fall in love. At Present, Bhaskar Rao is stuck in between, so, he guns Ankanmma on Ramu. In that predicament, Ramu accepts her as his wife, afterward, he clearly explains the reality, all of them play a drama that starts teasing Bhaskar Rao, finding the whereabouts of Raja and safeguarding him in the circus company. Eventually, Bhaskar Rao detects their play and plans to kill Raja. Knowing it, Ramu rushes to the circus and saves him. In that quarrel, Raja gets back his memory and both of them see the end of Bhaskar Rao. Finally, the movie ends on a happy note with the marriage of Ramu & Jaya.

Cast
N. T. Rama Rao as Ramu & Raja (dual role)
Jaya Prada as Jaya
Sujatha as Ankamma
Rao Gopal Rao as Bhaskar Rao
Allu Ramalingaiah as Circus Owner Chalapathi Rao
Mohan Babu as Sambaiah
Prabhakar Reddy as Lawyer Yugandhar 
Tyagaraju as Zamindar Koteswara Rao 
K.V.Chalam as Paul
Savitri as Janaki Devi
Jayamalini as Jayamalini
Jhansi as Tayaramma

Soundtrack
Music composed by K. V. Mahadevan. Lyrics were written by Veturi.

References

External links
 

Indian action drama films
Films directed by Dasari Narayana Rao
Films scored by K. V. Mahadevan
Indian pregnancy films
1980s Telugu-language films
1980s action drama films
1980 films